Erika S.L. "Kika" Markham (born 1940) is an English actress.

Early life
Markham is a daughter of actor David Markham and writer Olive Dehn (1914–2007). She has three sisters: Petra, Sonia and Jehane Markham.

Career
Markham has had a long career in the cinema, television and theatre as an actress. Among her television appearances are roles in Edward & Mrs. Simpson, The Life and Times of David Lloyd George, A Very British Coup, Van der Valk, The Line of Beauty, Minder, Cracker, Agatha Christie's Poirot (The Double Clue), Sherlock Holmes' Wisteria Lodge and Mr Selfridge. Her films include Bunny Lake Is Missing (1965), Futtocks End (1970), François Truffaut's Two English Girls (1971), Operation Daybreak (1975), Noroît (1976), The Blood of Hussain (1980), High Tide (1980), Outland (1981, as Sean Connery's wife), The Innocent (1985), Wonderland (1999), Esther Kahn (2000), Killing Me Softly (2002) and Franklyn (2008).

Markham married actor Corin Redgrave in Wandsworth, London, in 1985. The couple have two sons, Harvey (born 1979) and Arden (born 1983). Markham and Redgrave appeared together twice on screen: first in Lynda La Plante's Trial and Retribution (2000) as a judge and barrister, respectively; and later in the BBC's Waking The Dead (episode "Special Relationship: Part 1") as lovers suspected of the murder of a government advisor. They also appeared on stage together in an acclaimed revival of Noël Coward's A Song at Twilight, along with sister-in-law Vanessa Redgrave. Her sisters are the actress Petra Markham; the poet and dramatist Jehane Markham, widow of actor Roger Lloyd-Pack; and Sonia. In April 2020, she appeared in an episode of the BBC soap opera Doctors as Grace Wilson.

Markham's memoir of her husband, Our Time of Day: My Life with Corin Redgrave, was published in 2014.

References

External links 
 

1940 births
Living people
20th-century English actresses
21st-century English actresses
Actresses from Cheshire
People from Macclesfield
Date of birth missing (living people)
English child actresses
English film actresses
English stage actresses
English television actresses
Redgrave family